Pedro Sánchez de Mathos (c. 1635 - c. 1705) was the first municipal magistrate of Ponce, Puerto Rico, in 1692. He was appointed mayor by the Governor of Puerto Rico, Juan Robles de Lorenzana. He had been regidor (a type of municipal councilman) in San German in 1676 and was its mayor in 1688.

He was born around 1635 in San German, Puerto Rico. His parents were Juan Lorenzo de Matos and Catalina Sanchez. In 1686, Sánchez de Mathos owned six slaves, making it likely he was a landowner or cattle rancher and used slave labor to tend to the land or his cattle.

Background
The difficulty of crossing the Cordillera Central, sometimes taking as long as 37 days, created unique challenges for the Spanish-appointed authorities in San Juan to govern over the entire island. As a result, the island was divided into two political regions—one based in San Juan and a second one based in San German. As years went by the political influence of the partido de San German grew to the point that it challenged that of San Juan. To reign in the growing influence from San German and maintain control over the entire island, in 1678-1683, Governor Juan Robles de Lorenzana attempted to establish additional administrative units, called partidos, carving some of them, including the one for Ponce, out of the San German jurisdiction. The plan was unsuccessful, as the governor's term came to a close and no one was interested in serving as the head of such new Partido de Ponce. In 1690, a new governor, Gaspar de Arredondo y Valle, sent a letter the Real Audiencia of the Indies in Santo Domingo where he proposed the creation of five new administrative units, including one in Ponce. As the letter went unanswered, in 1692 the governor proceeded to create, not five administrative units, but five military units, which would be headed by a military officer who would function as mayor and have powers for civilian oversight as well.  In 1692, during the governorship of Gaspar de Arredondo y Valle, the Spanish Crown officially gave its blessing to the creation of the Partido de Ponce, but Ponce was already operating with a military commander functioning as a mayor, Pedro Sánchez de Mathos.

Mayoral term
Given that Sánchez de Mathos was already functioning as Teniente a guerra in the jurisdiction of Ponce since December 1685, the creation of the Partido de Ponce was more of an official confirmation of his position than an appointment to a newly created position. Pedro Sánchez de Mathos functioned as mayor until 1701. He received no payment of his service as mayor.

See also

 List of mayors of Ponce, Puerto Rico
 List of Puerto Ricans

References

Footnotes

Further reading
 Luis Caldera Ortiz. Nuevos Hallazgos Sobre el Origen de Ponce. Centro de Estudios e Investigaciones del Sur Oeste de Puerto Rico. 2019. pp. 129-136. </ref>

1630s births
Year of birth uncertain
Year of death unknown
Mayors of Ponce, Puerto Rico
People from San Germán, Puerto Rico